The Plant Genome is a triannual peer-reviewed scientific journal covering all aspects of plant genomics. It is published by Wiley on behalf of the  Crop Science Society of America. Since 2013, it is available online only. The journal began as a supplement to Crop Science from 2006 to 2008 and was established as a stand-alone open-access journal later in 2008.

Abstracting and indexing 
The journal is abstracted and indexed in:

According to the Journal Citation Reports, the journal has a 2020 impact factor of 4.089.

References

External links

Botany journals
Creative Commons Attribution-licensed journals
Genomics journals
Wiley (publisher) academic journals
Triannual journals
Publications established in 2008
English-language journals